Denton Enterprise Airport , also known as Denton Airport and previously Denton Municipal Airport, is a city-owned, public-use airport located three nautical miles (6 km) west of the central business district of Denton, a city in Denton County, Texas, United States.

This airport is assigned a three-letter location identifier of DTO by the Federal Aviation Administration, but it does not have an International Air Transport Association (IATA) airport code.

History
The airport was established in 1942 and used during 1943–44 by the United States Army Air Forces as a contract glider training airfield.  It was known at the time as Denton Field.  Harte Flying Service provided instruction.  It was used primarily by C-47 Skytrains and Waco CG-4 unpowered Gliders.  The mission of the school was to train glider pilot students in proficiency in operation of gliders in various types of towed and soaring flight, both day and night, and in servicing of gliders in the field.

It was inactivated in late 1944 with the drawdown of AAFTC's pilot training program.  It was then declared surplus and turned over to the Army Corps of Engineers on September 30, 1945.  It was eventually discharged to the War Assets Administration (WAA) and became a civil airport in December 1946.

Facilities and aircraft
It has two asphalt paved runways designated 18L,18R/36L,36R which measures 7,002 x 150 feet (2,134 x 46 m) and 5,003 x 75 feet (1,525 x 23 m).

For the 12-month period ending March 7, 2009, the airport had 105,010 aircraft operations, an average of 288 per day.  At that time there were 218 aircraft based at the airport: 77% single-engine, 13% multi-engine, and >1% jet, helicopter and glider.

The airport has 2 flight schools:
 In The Pattern
 US Aviation Academy

The airport also has 2 fixed-base operators (FBO):
 US Trinity Aviation
 US Jet Center

Additionally, the Hangar 10 Flying Museum is located here.

Civil Air Patrol
The airport has been home to the Nighthawk Composite Squadron (SWR-TX-413) of the Texas Wing Civil Air Patrol for over 20 years.

See also

 Texas World War II Army Airfields

References

External links
 Denton Airport at City of Denton web site
 
 
 

1942 establishments in Texas
Airports established in 1942
USAAF Contract Flying School Airfields
USAAF Glider Training Airfields
Airfields of the United States Army Air Forces in Texas
Airports in the Dallas–Fort Worth metroplex
Denton, Texas
Transportation in Denton County, Texas
Buildings and structures in Denton County, Texas